618 is a year.

618 may also refer to:
618 (number)
Area code 618
618 (18th June) shopping day in China
The international telephone code for Adelaide, Australia.